European Road Championships – Women's junior time trial is the annual European championship race for road bicycle racing for women in the Junior category. It is organised by the European governing body, the European Cycling Union. The winner of the event is entitled to wear the European jersey in Junior competitions for one year.

Medal winners

Source

Medallists by nation
Updated after the 2021 European Road Championships

References

Events at the European Road Championships
Cycling Road